Bertram Arthur Clements (1 December 1913 – July 2000) was an English footballer who represented Great Britain at the 1936 Summer Olympics. Clements played amateur football for Casuals. He also played cricket for Norfolk at minor counties level, making 49 appearances in the Minor Counties Championship either side of the Second World War.

References

External links

1913 births
2000 deaths
English footballers
Casuals F.C. players
Footballers at the 1936 Summer Olympics
Olympic footballers of Great Britain
Association football forwards
English cricketers
Norfolk cricketers